Alfred Steiner (born 29 December 1943) is a French weightlifter. He competed in the men's middle heavyweight event at the 1968 Summer Olympics.

References

1943 births
Living people
French male weightlifters
Olympic weightlifters of France
Weightlifters at the 1968 Summer Olympics
Sportspeople from Mannheim
20th-century French people